Basilan-BRT Peace Riders are a professional basketball team in the Maharlika Pilipinas Basketball League.

History
The Basilan Steel was the fifth expansion team of the Maharlika Pilipinas Basketball League from Visayas and Mindanao.  Then known as the Basilan Shooters Their application was accepted by the league in May 2018 who reasoned that they want to show the beauty of the team's home locality, Basilan, "thru basketball". They formally joined the MPBL on May 19, 2018, after the team entered into a contract with the league. They changed their name to the Basilan Steel by May 25, 2018.

The team make their debut in 2018 Anta Datu Cup.

In the 2019–20 MPBL Lakan season, the Basilan Steel reached the Division Finals. However the games were postponed due to the COVID-19 pandemic with the league resuming under a bubble format. Basilan defaulted its games due to its players testing positive for COVID-19 with Davao Occidental advancing to the finals. Disagreements on how the bubble tournament was organized led to Basilan leaving the MPBL altogether.

In 2021, Basilan moved from the MPBL to the Pilipinas VisMin Super Cup changing their name to the Peace Riders. Consequentially, the team became a professional team. The core of Basilan would also form part of the AICC Manila team which clinched the FilBasket Subic Championship in late 2021.

All-time roster

 Mark Jonas Ababon (MPBL 2018–2019)
 Ashrafh Abdullah (MPBL 2018–2019)
 Mark Anthony “Macky” Acosta (MPBL 2018–2019)
 Shaq Alanes (MPBL 2019–2021, VisMin 2021 1st)
 Gabrielle Aleria (FilBasket 2021)
 Jayvee Ansaldo (MPBL 2018, VisMin 2021 2nd)
 Juneric Baloria (VisMin 2021 1st, FilBasket 2021)
 Bobby Balucanag (MPBL 2019–2020, VisMin 2021 1st, FilBasket 2021)
 Clark Daniel Bautista (MPBL 2018–2019)
 Jhapz Bautista (MPBL 2018–2020)
 Reiner Bazan (MPBL 2019–2020)
 Jonathan Belorio (MPBL 2018)
 Chris Bitoon (VisMin 2021 1st, FilBasket 2021)
 Jong Bondoc (MPBL 2021)
 Mark Anthony Bringas (MPBL 2019–2021, VisMin 2021 1st, FilBasket 2021)
 Allyn Bulanadi (MPBL 2019–2020)
 April Jay Butallid (VisMin 2021 2nd)
 Jan Nino Cadiz (VisMin 2021 2nd)
 Francis Camacho (MPBL 2018)
 Jessie James “Jay” Collado (MPBL 2019–2021, VisMin 2021 1st, FilBasket 2021)
 Ferdinand Dennis Daa (MPBL 2018–2020, VisMin 2021 2nd)
 Fiel Dino Daa (MPBL 2018–2019)
 Gab Dagangon (MPBL 2019–2020, VisMin 2021 2nd)
 Cedric De Joya (VisMin 2021 2nd)
 Cris Dumapig (MPBL 2018–2020)
 Jhayo Eguilos (FilBasket 2021)
 Jerome Ferrer (VisMin 2021 2nd)
 John Julien Foronda (MPBL 2018)
 Hesed Leo Jose Gabo (MPBL 2019–2021, VisMin 2021 1st)
 Dexter Garcia (MPBL 2018–2020)
 Jaymar Gimpayan (MPBL 2021)
 Boy Goliva (VisMin 2021 2nd)
 Junjie Hallare (MPBL 2018–2020, VisMin 2021 1st & 2nd)
 Choi Ignacio (MPBL 2018–2019)
 Ar-Raouf Julkipli (MPBL 2018–2020, VisMin 2021 2nd)
 Michael Juico (MPBL 2021, VisMin 2021 1st, FilBasket 2021)
 Ramz Latip (VisMin 2021 1st & 2nd)
 Jan Carl Luciano (VisMin 2021 2nd)
 Darwin Lunor (MPBL 2019–2020, VisMin 2021 1st & 2nd)
 Ferdinand Lusdoc (MPBL 2018–2019)
 Michael Mabulac (VisMin 2021 1st, FilBasket 2021)
 Philip Martin Manalang (MPBL 2019–2021, VisMin 2021 1st, FilBasket 2021)
 Hafer Mondragon (MPBL 2018–2019)
 Jay Morada (VisMin 2021 2nd)
 Melgar Murillo (MPBL 2018–2020)
 Harold Ng (MPBL 2019–2021, VisMin 2021 1st, FilBasket 2021)
 Ezekiel Orque (MPBL 2018)
 Kaizhr Osama (MPBL 2018–2019)
 Irvin Palencia (MPBL 2019–2020)
 Nikko Panganiban (VisMin 2021 2nd)
 Miguel Plata (MPBL 2019–2020)
 Lester Reyes (MPBL 2021)
 Shareef Kim Saladin (VisMin 2021 1st & 2nd)
 Mohammad “Med” Salim (VisMin 2021 2nd)
 Encho Serrano (MPBL 2021)
 Stephen Siruma (MPBL 2021, VisMin 2021 1st, FilBasket 2021)
 Michole Sorela (MPBL 2019–2020)
 Jhayboy Solis (VisMin 2021 2nd)
 Neil Patrick Tan (VisMin 2021 1st)
 Jay-R “Shaq” Taganas (MPBL 2021, VisMin 2021 1st, FilBasket 2021)
 Jercules “Jojo” Tangkay (MPBL 2018–2019)
 Mark Anthony Trinidad (MPBL 2018–2020, VisMin 2021 1st)
 Jonathan Uyloan (MPBL 2019–2021, VisMin 2021 1st, FilBasket 2021)
 Jett Vidal (MPBL 2019–2020)

Team image

Arjay Hije of Chronos Athletics conceptualized the significant part of Basilan Steel's branding including the team's logo, jersey, and van decal designs.

Name
When the team joined the MPBL, it was initially known as the Basilan Shooters but the management decided to change the name of the team due to a perceived negative connotation of the name. While "shooters" may refer to the basketball player the management realized that it could also allude to gun users.

The name of Basilan Steel was derived from the idea that name of the team's home province came from the Yakan word "Besih" which means steel. Basilan was known for its abundant iron ore deposits which was used for sword and other weapons by early Filipinos.

Logo
The Basilan Steel's logo followed a gold and black color scheme (was later changed to red and black) and primarily consists of a Moro in traditional Yakan garments and a kalis, a indigenous sword with a wavy blade. The logo was designed by Arjay Hije under Chronos Athletics using a self-described "cultural approach" intending to challenge the negative reputation of Basilan as a war-torn area and terrorist-haven and project a positive image of the province. Black represents this negative perception while gold signifies the view of Hije of Basilan as a place where people "can live joyfully and harmoniously". The logo was abandoned when the team changed their name to Basilan Peace Riders. The logo was used again for Basilan's men's volleyball team in 2021.

MPBL records

See also
Basilan Steel Spikers

References

2018 establishments in the Philippines
Basketball teams established in 2018
Maharlika Pilipinas Basketball League teams
Pilipinas VisMin Super Cup teams